The National Bureau of Investigation (abbreviated as NBI) is an agency of the Philippine government under the Department of Justice, responsible for handling and solving major high-profile cases that are in the interest of the nation.

The NBI was modelled after the United States' Federal Bureau of Investigation (FBI) when it was being established.

History

The Division of Investigation, later renamed the National Bureau of Investigation, came into existence on June 19, 1947, the date Republic Act 157 was approved. Its history goes back to November 13, 1936, when a Division of Investigation (DI) under the Department of Justice was created with the enactment of Commonwealth Act No. 181 by the First National Assembly. Section 1, C.A. No. 181 provides:

A Division of Investigation under the Department of Justice is hereby created. It shall be composed of such personnel as may be necessary, in the discretion of the Secretary of Justice, and its duties shall be to help in the detection and prosecution of crimes; to acquire, collect, classify and preserve criminal identification records; and to obtain information on all matters affecting the public interest.

The DI was the brainchild of  Commonwealth President Manuel L. Quezon and the then–Secretary of Justice José Yulo. A veteran American police officer, Capt. Thomas Duggan of the New York Police Department (NYPD), and the only Filipino member of the United States Federal Bureau of Investigation (FBI), Flaviano Guerrero, were hired by the Philippine government to organize the Division of Investigation of the Department of Justice.

The formation of the DI generated considerable public interest and more than 3,000 applied for the initial 48 positions of NBI Agents. Physical and medical examinations were conducted by doctors from the Philippine General Hospital and San Lazaro Hospital. Of the 3,000 applicants, only 150 were allowed to take the mental test and, of this number, less than 100 passed. After further screening, 48 were certified for employment and of these successful candidates, only 45 actually accepted appointments as Agents.

The DI was then formally organized in 1937 and was composed of forty-five (45) Agents and approximately 100 officials and employees. These included lawyers, doctors, chemists, fingerprint technicians, photographers, research assistants, clerks, stenographers, janitors and messengers. The DI office operated in Manila, where its Agents and technical personnel were dispatched to the provinces from time to time to investigate crimes of public interest or when the necessity arose.

The DI operation was suspended upon the surrender of the Commonwealth Government to the occupying Japanese forces during World War II. The Japanese, however, revived the DI and allowed it to function as a division under the Department of Justice until the establishment of the Japanese puppet Philippine Republic of President José P. Laurel. During the Laurel administration, the DI was merged with the Secret Service Division of the Metropolitan Constabulary (Manila Police Department or MPD) and the Intelligence Unit of the Japanese-run Philippine Constabulary.

Upon the liberation of the Philippines by combined Filipino and American forces in 1945, the DI was not immediately reorganized since most of its original members were seconded in the service of the United States Army Counterintelligence Corps (CIC). After the surrender of Japan in August 1945, the DI was reactivated and the original members were called back to the service. The reactivated DI started with no records or equipment, most of which had been systematically destroyed by DI personnel for security reasons in order to prevent classified documents and equipment from falling into the hands of the Japanese.

In 1947, as the Philippines struggled to recover from the ravages of war, criminality in all its forms increased dramatically, straining the meager resources of the newly reorganized police service in effectively combating sophisticated organized crime groups and the solution of complex crimes. Due to the increase of lawlessness in the land, DI personnel agitated for the conversion of the Division of Investigation into a bureau, believing that an enlarged, highly professional and better equipped bureau similar to that of the American Federal Bureau of Investigation was needed to effectively fight organized crime groups and solve crimes of a complex nature.

In response, Congress filed House Bill No. 1162, from which Republic Act No. 157 originated. R.A. 157 was approved by Congress and enacted into law on June 19, 1947, which renamed DI to the Bureau of Investigation (BI). On October 4, 1947, R.A. 157 was amended by Executive Order No. 94 to change the name from BI to the National Bureau of Investigation.

Mandate
The NBI is mandated to investigate/take on the following cases:

 Extrajudicial/extra-legal killings by state security forces against media practitioners/activists.
 Murders of justices and judges
 Violations of the Cybercrime Prevention Act of 2012 (Republic Act No. 10175)
 Cases from the Inter-Agency Anti-Graft Coordinating Council
 Anti-Dummy Law cases
 Human trafficking cases in all Philippine airports
 Cases involving threats to security or assaults against the persons of the President, Vice President, Senate President, Speaker of the House of Representatives, and Chief Justice of the Supreme Court
 Transnational crimes based on international agreements
 Identification of victims of natural disasters
 Violations of:
 the E-Commerce Act of 2000 (Republic Ac No. 8792);
 the Access Devices Regulations Act of 1998 (Republic Act No. 8484);
 the Intellectual Property Code of the Philippines (Republic Act No. 8293);
 the Securities Regulation Code (Republic Act No. 8799);
 the Decree Increasing the Penalty for Certain Forms of Estafa (Presidential Decree No. 1689)

Organization

Organizational structure
The National Bureau of Investigation (NBI) is a line agency under the Department of Justice and serves as the premier investigative agency of government. The agency director is a Presidential appointee and serves under the trust and confidence of the President and the Secretary of Justice (SOJ).

The branches consist of the following:

Rank structure

The rank structure was reformed by Republic Act No. 10867, the 2016 Act "Reorganizing and Modernizing the National Bureau of Investigation (NBI), and Providing Funds Therefore"

The following was the old rank system used by the NBI:

 Director VI	
 Director V (assistant director)	
 Director III (deputy director)	
 Director II (Regional Director)	
 Director I (Assistant Regional Director)	
 Investigation Agent VI (Head Agent)	
 Investigation Agent V (Supervising Agent)	
 Investigation Agent IV (Senior Agent)	
 Investigation Agent III	
 Investigation Agent II	
 Investigation Agent I		
 Special Investigator V		
 Special Investigator IV		
 Special Investigator III	

The following ranks were established after RA 10867 was passed in 2016:

 Director 
 Deputy Director
 Assistant Director
 Regional Director
 Assistant Regional Director
 Head Agent
 Supervising Agent
 Senior Agent 
 Investigation Agent III

NBI directors

The heads of the NBI since the founding on November 13, 1936, were:

References

External links

Department of Justice (Philippines)
Philippine intelligence agencies
Law enforcement in the Philippines
National Central Bureaus of Interpol